Apollonias barbujana , the Canary laurel or barbusano, is perhaps the only species of flowering plants belonging to the genus Apollonias of the laurel family, Lauraceae. It is endemic to the Macaronesian islands  of Madeira and the Canary Islands. Molecular phylogenies have found that the species is nested within the genus Persea, closely related to Persea americana (avocado).

The La Gomera subspecies is distinct and endangered.

References

Lauraceae
Endemic flora of Macaronesia
Flora of the Canary Islands
Flora of Madeira